is a 2012 fighting game developed by Arika and Namco Bandai Games, which also publishes it, released for the Nintendo 3DS. It is the second Tekken game to be released for a Nintendo platform after the 2001 video game Tekken Advance. The game is a graphically updated version of Tekken 6 for the Nintendo 3DS, supporting the handheld's 3D capabilities and maintaining a steady 60 FPS even when running in 3D; however, the 3D is disabled during wireless play. 40 characters and stages are included in the game, as well as 700 collectable Tekken cards. In addition, the 2011 film Tekken: Blood Vengeance is included in the package.

Development 
During its press conference at E3, Nintendo announced Tekken would be coming to the 3DS handheld. At Namco Bandai Games' booth at E3, they showcased a demo of the Tekken in-game engine running on the 3DS. Producer Katsuhiro Harada stated that the game would run in full 60 frames per second with the 3D on.

On August 17, 2011, a new trailer for Tekken 3D: Prime Edition was released, along with its name. It was also revealed that the game would include over 40 characters, as well as a 3D version of the film Tekken: Blood Vengeance on the game's cartridge. The game also has more than 700 artwork cards to collect, mostly cutscenes from the Blood Vengeance movie that can be shared via the StreetPass function on the 3DS. Originally, it was announced that the game would have 21 Tag Challenges but these are not actually present in the game. Also not in the game was 40 stages, that were originally promised for the game.

All characters retain their two available costumes from Tekken 6 (unlike Tekken Tag Tournament 2). A Color Edit feature is added for changing the color palettes of character's costumes.

Fighters 
All 41 fighters from Tekken 6 return in this game. Heihachi Mishima, while present, appears younger like he was in the original Tekken and Tekken 2, due to drinking a serum to regain his youth as per the storyline of Tekken Tag Tournament 2. It is gossip that this is due to the passing of the character's previous voice actor, Daisuke Gōri. 

 Alisa Bosconovitch
 Anna Williams
 Armor King II
 Asuka Kazama
 Baek Doo San
 Bob
 Bruce Irvin
 Bryan Fury
 Christie Monteiro
 Craig Marduk
 Devil Jin

 Eddy Gordo
 Feng Wei
 Ganryu
 Heihachi Mishima
 Hwoarang
 Jack-6
 Jin Kazama
 Julia Chang
 Kazuya Mishima
 King II
 Kuma II

 Lars Alexandersson
 Lee Chaolan
 Lei Wulong
 Leo
 Lili
 Ling Xiaoyu
 Marshall Law
 Miguel Caballero Rojo
 Mokujin
 Nina Williams
 Panda

 Paul Phoenix
 Raven
 Roger Jr.
 Sergei Dragunov
 Steve Fox
 Wang Jinrei
 Yoshimitsu
 Zafina

Reception

Tekken 3D: Prime Edition has received mixed reviews. IGN has greatly praised the game's visuals and good framerate, but it lamented its lack of game modes and low replay value. GameSpot stated that while it looked and played very well, the game seemed incomplete. Tech-Gaming found the game's engine to be up to the task, but bemoaned the laggy online multiplayer. GamesRadar gave the game 5/10, praising its high character roster and graphics, but criticising its lack of single player modes. Tekken 3D: Prime Edition currently has a Metacritic score of 64 out of 100.

Notes

References

External links
 Official website 

2012 video games
3D fighting games
Namco games
Nintendo 3DS games
Nintendo 3DS-only games
Nintendo Network games
Video games developed in Japan
Video games scored by Yousuke Yasui
3D: Prime Edition